Qarah Zaki (also Romanized as Qarah Zakī) is a village in Benajuy-ye Shomali Rural District, in the Central District of Bonab County, East Azerbaijan Province, Iran. At the 2006 census, its population was 100, in 23 families.

References 

Populated places in Bonab County